Reza Kardoust is an Iranian football player, currently plays for Esteghlal Khuzestan at Iran Pro League.

Club history
Born in Rasht, he started his career with Sepidrood and Pegah Gilan youth teams. In 2005 he joined Pegah Gilan senior team. In 2007 he moved to Sepidrood in Iran Football's 2nd Division, in 2010 Sepidrood was promoted to Azadegan League after 11 years and Kardoust was part of the team.

In the next season he was transferred to Tarbiat Yazd under Davoud Mahabadi's management. In 2011 Davoud Mahabadi became Gahar Zagros head coach and took Kardoost with him to the new club. Kardoost helped Gahar to promote to Iran Pro League.

After spending his first season in the Iran Pro League with Gahar, he moved back to his hometown and Damash Gilan in summer 2013. After Damash's relegation, Kardoust joined Esteghlal Khuzestan with a two-year contract.

Club statistics

References

External links
Reza Kardoust at PersianLeague.com
Iran Pro League Stats
Damash at persianleague.com

Living people
People from Rasht
Iranian footballers
Damash Gilan players
Esteghlal Khuzestan players
1984 births
Association football midfielders
Sportspeople from Gilan province